Anania albeoverbascalis is a moth in the family Crambidae. It was described by Hiroshi Yamanaka in 1966. It is found in Japan (Honshu) and China.

References

Moths described in 1966
Pyraustinae
Moths of Japan
Moths of Asia